The 15th annual Berlin International Film Festival was held from 25 June to 6 July 1965. The festival started selecting the jury members on its own rather than countries sending designated representatives. The Golden Bear was awarded to the French film Alphaville directed by Jean-Luc Godard.

Jury
The following people were announced as being on the jury for the festival:
 John Gillett, film critic (United Kingdom) - Jury President
 Alexander Kluge, director, producer and writer (West Germany)
 Ely Azeredo, film critic (Brazil)
 Monique Berger, journalist and film critic (France)
 Kyushiro Kusakabe, film critic (Japan)
 Jerry Bresler, film producer (United States)
 Karena Niehoff, journalist and film critic (West Germany)
 , director and producer (West Germany)
 Hans-Dieter Roos, film critic (West Germany)

Films in competition
The following films were in competition for the Golden Bear award:

Key
{| class="wikitable" width="550" colspan="1"
| style="background:#FFDEAD;" align="center"| †
|Winner of the main award for best film in its section
|}

Awards

The following prizes were awarded by the Jury:
 Golden Bear: Alphaville by Jean-Luc Godard
 Silver Bear for Best Director: Satyajit Ray for Charulata
 Silver Bear for Best Actress: Madhur Jaffrey for Shakespeare Wallah
 Silver Bear for Best Actor: Lee Marvin for Cat Ballou
 Silver Bear Extraordinary Jury Prize: 
 Repulsion by Roman Polanski
 Le bonheur by Agnès Varda
 Special Mention: Walter Newman and Frank Pierson for Cat Ballou
Youth Film Award
Best Feature Film Suitable for Young People: Pajarito Gómez by Rodolfo Kuhn
Youth Film Award – Honorable Mention
Best Short Film Suitable for Young People: Das Boot von Torreira by Alfred Ehrhardt
Best Feature Film Suitable for Young People: Cat Ballou by Elliot Silverstein
FIPRESCI Award
Repulsion by Roman Polanski
FIPRESCI Award – Honorable Mention
Love 65 by Bo Widerberg
OCIC Award
Charulata by Satyajit Ray
UNICRIT Award
Ninety Degrees in the Shade by Jiří Weiss

References

External links
 15th Berlin International Film Festival 1965
1965 Berlin International Film Festival
Berlin International Film Festival:1965  at Internet Movie Database

15
1965 film festivals
1965 in West Germany
1960s in West Berlin